Zambezia (also known as Adventures in Zambezia) is an 2012 South African 3D computer animation adventure film. The film was directed by Wayne Thornley, written by Andrew Cook, Raffaella Delle Donne, and Anthony Silverston, and stars the voices of Jeremy Suarez, Abigail Breslin, Jeff Goldblum, Leonard Nimoy, and Samuel L. Jackson with supporting roles done by Jim Cummings, Richard E. Grant, Jenifer Lewis, Jamal Mixon, and David Shaughnessy. It tells the story of a peregrine falcon who journeys to the titular bird city of Zambezia. Zambezia is the first film produced by Triggerfish Animation Studios and distributed by Cinema Management Group and Sony Pictures in English territories.

Zambezia was theatrically released on 3 July 2012 and earned $34.4 million on a R173 million ($20 million USD) budget. It received Annie Award nominations for Music in an Animated Feature Production and for Voice Acting in an Animated Feature Production. The film won the Best South African Feature Film at the Durban International Film Festival in 2012. It also won Best Animation at the South African Film and Television Awards and Best Animation at the 9th Africa Movie Academy Awards.

Plot
Kai, a high-spirited young peregrine falcon on the cusp of adulthood is bored and lonely living in a remote outpost in the Katungu grassland with only his strict father, Tendai, for company. Forbidden from venturing beyond the Katungu Boundary, his suspicions that there must be more to life are confirmed when a saddle-billed stork named Gogo, her weaver bird co-pilot Tini, and recently newly hatched ducklings crash land into his nest. From them, Kai learns that downriver is a bustling bird city called Zambezia with exciting opportunities for a talented flier such as himself, where Gogo and Tini are going. In an angry exchange with his father and an encounter with the marabou storks (whose species were left out of the founding of Zambezia) Cecil, the marabou's leader, his brother Sill, and his cousin Morton who had been following Gogo and Tini on their route to Zambezia to eat eggs that Gogo and Tini were caring, which led to Tendai accidentally killing Sill by getting him stuck on a branch and drowning him when the branch breaks, in a struggle to save Kai, Gogo, and Tini. Kai discovers that Tendai has known all along about Zambezia and has been there himself even after Gogo, Tini, and the marabous recognized him. Hurt and angry at his father's lies, Kai leaves Katungu and journeys downriver. The following night, Tendai then tries to follow Kai to apologize to him.

Arriving at Zambezia – a majestic Baobab perched on the edge of Victoria Falls – Kai is amazed by the throngs of birds from all over the world who are busy preparing for the annual Spring Celebrations. He soon befriends a fast-talking nightjar called Ezee who knows how to enjoy the perks of community life and guides him through the city. Kai is bowled over when he meets Zoe, a beautiful and feisty kite who is the adopted daughter of Sekhuru, Zambezia's founder and a wise old eagle. Kai doesn't make a good first impression when he accidentally ruins her Spring Celebration decorations, but is thrilled when his skilful flying earns him a place on the Hurricanes, the elite defense patrol made up of the best fliers in Zambezia that Tendai used to be in, led by a fat lammergeier named Ajax.

Unbeknownst to him and the rest of the Zambezians, the marabou have joined forces with a ruthless rock monitor named Budzo and hatched a plan to take control of Zambezia. To make matters worse, Budzo had captured Tendai when he stumbled upon him while Tendai was trying to find Kai. Then they capture all of the weavers during the beginning of the Spring Celebration, including Tini & force them to make a bridge for Budzo to cross. Kai, Ezee and  Zoe try to follow the Hurricanes on a reconnaissance mission the following night, where Ezee gets his back broken & ends up in the hospital, and they almost encounter the marabous and Budzo & learn of their plan, but it results in Kai getting kicked out of the Hurricanes, but at the same time, the marabous lure the Hurricanes into a trap.

Gogo takes Kai to Sekhuru, who reveals that Zambezia was his birthplace and was raised by Tendai and his late mother Amaya, who had both founded the Hurricanes, but during a mission involving a kite nest attacked by Budzo, she was eaten and therefore blinded Tendai with grief who left to Katungu to raise Kai after he could no longer see the value of Zambezia, but only the cost, while the Hurricanes were only able to rescue one egg, which was Zoe's egg. They reveal what the marabous and Budzo are planning to Sekhuru and Gogo. In order to save Zambezia, Zoe goes to find the Hurricanes, while Kai, Gogo, go to rescue Tini, the weavers, and Tendai  succeed to free them, but the marabous and Budzo have left to Zambezia to eat all the eggs just in time. During this, the marabous realize Budzo has his own group of rock monitors and Budzo betrays them.

Kai and Tendai confront the marabous, but Kai realize the marabous are birds and before Budzo can reach the nursery to eat their eggs, Kai persuades the marabous to turn against Budzo and then lectures the other birds to join the fight. Zoe rescues Ajax and the rest of Hurricanes and gets out of the trap to join the battle. Budzo easily overpowers Tendai, and corners him on a ferris wheel while the Hurricanes drop the rocks on the bridge and kill the Budzo's army, while a fully healed Ezee, the other birds and the Hurricanes trap him with a net & push the wheel Budzo is on with all their strengths and manage to push Budzo and the wheel toward the falls and defeats Budzo once and for all as the wheel is destroyed after hitting a precipice, and Budzo falls into the waterfalls to his death while Kai follows him to save Zoe after she got snagged in the net an Kai manages to pull up Zoe from the net, therefore saving Zambezia.

With the rock monitors defeated, the Zambezians celebrate with a proper Spring Celebration and the marabous are accepted into Zambezia which pleases them.

In a mid credits scene, a baby rock monitor that Kai and Tendai were trying to catch earlier  eventually reaches shore, where it is suddenly cornered by the marabous, who then unexpectedly offer it two snacks of bugs on a stick.

Voice cast
 Jeremy Suarez as Kai, a young peregrine falcon.
 Abigail Breslin as Zoe, a black-winged kite.
 Jeff Goldblum as Ajax, a fat lammergeier who is the leader of the Hurricanes.
 Leonard Nimoy as Chief Sekhuru, an African fish eagle who is the elder of Zambezia and had lost one of his wings in an earlier battle.
 Samuel L. Jackson as Tendai, a peregrine falcon, founder and former member of the Hurricanes, and Kai's father.
 Jenifer Lewis as Gogo, a kooky saddle-billed stork who tells Kai about Zambezia.
 Jim Cummings as Budzo, a Rock monitor who seeks to invade Zambezia and the leader of his bank who swayed the marabou storks to his side.
 Jamal Mixon as Ezee, a fast-talking nightjar who befriends Kai.
 Richard E. Grant as Cecil, the leader of the marabou storks.
 David Shaughnessy as Morton, a marabou stork who is Cecil's fourth cousin once removed.
 Noureen DeWulf as Pavi, an African sacred ibis who befriends Kai.
 Tania Gunadi as Tini, a weaver bird and Gogo's friend.
 Deep Roy as Mushana, a green pigeon
 Phil LaMarr as an African grey parrot, the arrival announcer for Zambezia.
 Phil LaMarr also voices Dodo, a guineafowl.
 Corey Burton as Neville, a Lilian's lovebird.
 Tress MacNeille as Neville's wife, a Lilian's lovebird.
 Lee Duru as Nursery Bird, a Lapwing
 Zolani Mahola as a weaver bird

Kelly Stables and Kristen Rutherford provide the voices of the Gossip Birds, a group of Guinea turacos.

Jim Cummings, Tom Kenny, Jon Olson, Brent Palmer, and Wayne Thornley provide the voices of the assorted marabou storks.

Keeno Lee Hector, Nik Rabinowitz, and Sam Riegel provided the voices of various Hurricanes.

Release 
Zambezia was theatrically released on 3 July 2012 by Cinema Management Group and Sony Pictures Entertainment in English territories and was released on DVD and Blu-ray on 24 April 2013 by Sony Pictures Home Entertainment.

Accolades 
The film won the Best South African Feature Film at the Durban International Film Festival in 2012.  It also won Best Animation at the South African Film and Television Awards and Best Animation at the 9th Africa Movie Academy Awards.

Soundtrack 

The original motion picture soundtrack for the film was written, composed and produced by Bruce Retief, which was released on 20 September 2013 through Triggerfish in digital download. It includes fourteen tracks, with music from Retief as the film's score composer, and studio performances from various artists, including Gang of Instrumentals, Zolani Mahola (who also provided the voice of a weaver in the film), and Ludovic Mampuya. It is available on iTunes and on Amazon.

Track listing 
All music written and composed by Bruce Retief, except where noted.

References

External links 

 
 
 
 

2012 films
2010s English-language films
2010s children's adventure films
Animated comedy films
South African animated films
Animated films about birds
2012 comedy-drama films
2012 3D films
2012 computer-animated films
2010s adventure comedy films
Best Animation Africa Movie Academy Award winners
Films about lizards
Films set in Africa
3D animated films
2012 directorial debut films